Ptisana salicina, or king fern, is a species of fern native to Norfolk Island, New Zealand and the South Pacific. Large and robust with a distinctive tropical appearance, it has fronds up to 5 metres (16 feet +/-) tall that arise from a starchy base that was a traditional food for the Maori. It has several other common names including para, tawhiti-para, and horseshoe fern.

Distribution
King fern is indigenous to Norfolk Island (the type locality), New Zealand, New Caledonia, Cook Islands, Austral Islands, Society Islands and the Marquesas. It is closely related to Ptisana smithii of Vanuatu, Fiji, the Solomon Islands, Samoa and Tonga.

In New Zealand it is found in lowland areas on the north-western half of the North Island from inland Wanganui northwards. It is most abundant in the western Waikato, where it is found in forests and forest remnants. It prefers limestone-rich soils, including the entrances to caves and shady stream sides. It often grows in New Zealand association with parataniwha (Elatostema rugosum) and supplejack (Ripogonum scandens).

Threats
King fern is in serious decline in New Zealand, seriously threatened throughout its range by feral and domestic cattle, wild pigs and goats. Large plants no longer exist except in areas where there has been rigorous control of animals, or in inaccessible cave entrances or steep-sided gorges in karst areas. Another serious threat comes from plant collectors who are said to have wiped out several large populations in the Kawhia district.

Description
The green cane-like leaf stalks are 1 to 3 metres long. The young fronds are protected as they uncoil by a large ear-shaped basal lobe at the base called a stipule. The glossy, dark green fronds are 4 metres, sometimes 5 metres long and 2 metres wide. The juvenile fronds are less robust, and wilt quickly if exposed to sunlight. In the Kawhia area, a distinctive form is sometimes encountered, which has crested tips on the adult leaflets. Specimens of suitable age may produce spores at any time in the year.

Propagation
Propagation is difficult. King fern can be grown from spores, but this is extremely slow. It is sometimes offered for sale in nurseries that specialise in native plants.

See also
 Marattia purpurascens from Ascension Island.
 Danaea kalevala, a related plant from the Caribbean and boto.

References

Marattiidae
Ferns of Australasia
Ferns of Australia
Ferns of New Zealand
Flora of the Tubuai Islands
Flora of the south-central Pacific